Television in Honduras consists of both local channels and foreign television, normally distributed through cable.

History 
Honduras had initially adopted ATSC Standards for digital terrestrial television broadcasting, but later decided to adopt the ISDB-T International standard used in many other Latin American nations.
The Comisión Nacional de Telecomunicaciones (CONATEL) decided on January 9, 2007 to adopt the ATSC standard, which went into effect on January 16, 2007, when it was published in the "Diario Oficial La Gaceta". The first Digital High Definition TV Station, CampusTv, was founded by Universidad de San Pedro Sula.

Honduran TV channels

The following are some of the tv channels produced in Honduras.
gotv
Canal 11 
 Cholusat Sur Canal 36
 Maya TV Canal 66
 Teleceiba Canal 7 
Televicentro (Honduras) 
Televisión Nacional de Honduras
MundoTV Canal 42
Telecentro
Enlace Honduras Canal 57
Roatan Travel Network
CANETTV (VOD)

See also 
 Media of Honduras

References